Ananindeua is a city in Pará, northern Brazil.  It is a part of the Metropolitan Region of Belém, and is the second most populated city in the State of  Pará, and the third largest in the Brazilian Amazon region. It has a population of 535,547 according to the last estimation of 2020, done by the Brazilian Statistic and Geography Institute (IBGE).

The municipality contains 1% of the Utinga State Park, created in 1993 to protect the metropolitan area's water supply.

Education

Amazon Valley Academy and College of Amazon are located in this city.

Sport
Clube Municipal Ananindeua represents the city.

References

Municipalities in Pará